OpenLayers is an open-source (provided under the 2-clause BSD License) JavaScript library for displaying map data in web browsers as slippy maps. It provides an API for building rich web-based geographic applications similar to Google Maps and Bing Maps.

Features
OpenLayers supports GeoRSS, KML (Keyhole Markup Language), Geography Markup Language (GML), GeoJSON and map data from any source using OGC-standards as Web Map Service (WMS) or Web Feature Service (WFS).

History 
The library was originally based on the Prototype JavaScript Framework.

OpenLayers was created by MetaCarta after the O'Reilly Where 2.0 conference of June 29–30, 2005, and released as open source software before the Where 2.0 conference of June 13–14, 2006, by MetaCarta Labs.  Two other open-source mapping tools released by MetaCarta are FeatureServer and TileCache.  Since November 2007, OpenLayers has been an Open Source Geospatial Foundation project.

Notes

External links 

 

Free GIS software
Geographical technology
JavaScript libraries
Keyhole Markup Language
Web mapping